Zographus cingulatus is a species of beetle in the family Cerambycidae. It was described by Per Olof Christopher Aurivillius in 1913. It is known from the Democratic Republic of the Congo, Angola, and Malawi.

References

Sternotomini
Beetles described in 1913